Oleh Sheptytskyi (born 1 September 1986, Sudova Vyshnia, Lviv Oblast, Ukrainian SSR) is a Ukrainian football forward who plays for FC Rukh Vynnyky in the Ukrainian Second League.

External links

 Profile on Official Website

1986 births
Living people
People from Sudova Vyshnia
Ukrainian footballers
FC Naftovyk-Ukrnafta Okhtyrka players
FC Lviv players
FC Karpaty-2 Lviv players
FC Rukh Lviv players
Association football forwards
Sportspeople from Lviv Oblast